Rossair Charter was an air charter company based in Adelaide, Australia. In November 2013, it merged with Air South, another South Australia based charter company. In July 2018, the company was placed into voluntary administration.

History
The company was established in 1963. It was Australia's second oldest continually operating air transport company, the oldest being Qantas. On 1 June 2017 the company ceased operations after one of their aircraft on a training flight crashed in Renmark, South Australia. All 3 on board, including the company's Chief Pilot and a CASA Inspector, were killed. Following this incident the company continued non-flying operations until July 2018 when it was placed into voluntary administration.

Fleet
As of November 2013 the Rossair fleet consists of the following aircraft:

 3 Cessna 441 Conquest II
 2 Beechcraft 1900D
 2 Embraer EMB 120 Brasilia

Incidents and accidents
 On 25 January 1972, a Rossair Beechcraft V35A (registered VH-TYA) collided with a radio mast guy wire and subsequently crashed at Compressor Station 13 of the Moomba Natural Gas Pipeline, 65 miles south-east of Leigh Creek, South Australia. All four of the aircraft's occupants were killed.
 On 1 February 1976, a Rossair Cessna 172 (registered VH-UGC) collided with a Piper PA-28 Cherokee on final approach to Parafield Airport. All four people on board the Rossair Cessna 172 and the sole occupant of the Piper PA-28 Cherokee were killed.
 On 27 March 1976, a Rossair Cessna 180 (registered VH-TCU) suffered an in-flight breakup over the Adelaide suburb of Blackwood, killing the sole occupant.
 On 30 May 2017, an accident with a Rossair Cessna 441 (registered VH-XMJ) that took off from Renmark Airport and crashed approximately 4 kilometres away killed all three occupants on board.

See also
List of defunct airlines of Australia

References

External links

 Official website

Defunct airlines of Australia
Airlines established in 1963
Airlines disestablished in 2018
Defunct charter airlines
Regional Aviation Association of Australia
Airlines of South Australia
Australian companies established in 1963
Australian companies disestablished in 2018
Insolvent companies